Terrorizer is a band

Terrorizer (magazine)
Terrorizers, Taiwanese film
The Terrorizers, Matt Helm novel